Alstonia spatulata, also called hard milkwood or Siamese balsa, is a species of tree in the family Apocynaceae. It is found in Cambodia, Indonesia, Laos, Malaysia, Papua New Guinea, the Philippines, Singapore, Thailand, and Vietnam.

References

External links
 Original description of A. spatulata by C.L. Blume

spatulata
Trees of Indo-China
Trees of Malesia
Trees of Papua New Guinea
Least concern plants
Least concern biota of Asia
Least concern flora of Oceania
Taxonomy articles created by Polbot